La Grand-Combe is a commune in the Gard department in southern France.

Geography
The town lies on the opposite bank of the river Gardon d'Alès from Les Salles-du-Gardon. It is 13 km upstream and north of Alès in the Cevennes gardoises.

Climate

La Grand-Combe has a hot-summer Mediterranean climate (Köppen climate classification Csa).

Etymology
In French "combe" is a feminine noun derived from the Celtic noun cumba meaning valley. The feminine form of the adjective grand would suggest the use of a final "e", but here it uses the archaic form derived directly from Latin- this can also be found in the spelling of "grand-mère", and "grand-rue" and in the place name La Grand-Croix (Loire), Grand was the traditional spelling but the "e" was added to modern French in an attempt to harmonise the treatment of all adjectives. The name of the town took the spelling of la Grand’Combe  but this has now been changed to la Grand-Combe.

History
This is a town which grew out of the industrial revolution, The commune  was created in 1846, carved out of the communes de Laval, Portes, Sainte-Cécile-d'Andorge, and Les Salles-du-Gardon. It became the seat of the canton 12 years later in 1858. During the Middle Ages, the valley was one of the cradles of the Cevennes coal industry, but it really was not until around 1780 on the initiative of Pierre-François Tubeuf that industrial mining techniques were used. Shafts were sunk, and the galleries were supported with wooden pit-props.

The Compagnie des Mines de la Grand’Combe et des chemins de fer du Gard was formed in 1836 by Paulin Talabot (1799–1885). By 1841, the Cevennes line had been built through la Grand-Combe and Alès. The line was extended to Brioude via Chamborigaud in 1867.

The company was successful providing coal for the French Navy and merchant marine. It adopted the trademark of an anchor. Domestic coal was also shipped to Marseilles.

This was very much a company town, and the workers were provided for from birth to death with good wages, free accommodation, heating, education, a Catholic church (1856 to 1864), and a chapel (1868) at Trescol for the Protestants.

After 1918, the town tended to elect mayors who were independent of the company. These were in the main socialist, or more recently communist. Though strikes were frequent, the company produced just under 1 million tonnes of coal annually. Coal was nationalised in 1946, and the companies regrouped modernized the more profitable mines. The Houillères du bassin des Cévennes had its peak year in 1958, when 20,000 workers mined 3.3 million tonnes of coal. Then in 1960, the town had 17,000 inhabitants, and numerous modern subsidized housing units and apartments were constructed, especially in Trescol. Today, Trescol has assisted area status(ZUS) due to it high unemployment rate.

The mines closed in the 1960s and 1970s. In 1968, Rochebelle àt Alès closed, and in 1978, the Richard and Destival mines. Finally, in 1984, the Oules mine, so by 1985 there was no coal being mined in the Cévennes. The Richard mine was classified a historic monument on 14 May 2008. The population fell to 5187, and unemployment remains at 40%.

Population

See also
Communes of the Gard department

References

External links

 Official site

Communes of Gard